Córdoba Club de Fútbol "B" is a Spanish football team based in Córdoba, in the autonomous community of Andalusia. Founded in 1951 as Club Atlético Almagro, it is the reserve team of Córdoba CF and currently plays in Tercera División RFEF – Group 10, holding home games at Ciudad Deportiva Rafael Gómez, with a 3,000-seat capacity.

History
In 2013, after finishing second to Algeciras CF in its Tercera División group, Córdoba B qualified for the play-offs, defeating CD Castellón 2–0 in the first round before being eliminated on the away goals rule by neighbouring reserve team Granada CF B in the second. However, due to the expulsion of another Andalusian team, cash-strapped Xerez CD, Córdoba B enlisted in Segunda División B for the first time ahead of the new season.

After a two-year stay in the third tier, Córdoba B was relegated, but bounced back instantly in 2016 by winning their group and defeating CF Lorca Deportiva 4–2 on aggregate in the play-off despite losing the first leg.

Season to season
As Club Atlético Almagro

As Club Deportivo Guardia de Franco

As Club Atlético Cordobés (Farm team)

 As Córdoba CF's reserve team

4 seasons in Segunda División B
27 seasons in Tercera División
2 seasons in Tercera Federación

Honours
Tercera División: 2015–16

Current squad

Notable players

 Sebas Moyano

Notable coaches
 José Antonio Romero
 Pablo Villa
 Rafael Berges

References

External links
Official website 
Futbolme team profile 

Football clubs in Andalusia
Association football clubs established in 1951
Córdoba CF
Spanish reserve football teams
1951 establishments in Spain